Hayward Municipal Airport may refer to:

 Hayward Executive Airport, formerly Hayward Municipal Airport, in Hayward, California, United States
 Sawyer County Airport, formerly Hayward Municipal Airport, in Hayward, Wisconsin, United States